The Tuoketuo Power Station is the largest coal-fired power station in the world. The plant is located in Togtoh County, Hohhot, Inner Mongolia, China. The plant is estimated to have been one of the ten most carbon emitting coal-fired power plants in the world in 2018, at 29.46 million tons of carbon dioxide, and relative emissions are estimated at 1.45 kg per kWh. The plant was commissioned in November 1995 by the Tuoketuo Power Company, which currently owns and operates the power station.

The units of the facility were commissioned in six separate phases, each phase consisting of two units, rated at  each, all of which run on coal. The 1st and 2nd units were commissioned in June and July 2003, the 3rd and 4th units were commissioned in July and September 2004, the 5th and 6th units were commissioned in September and November 2005, the 7th and 8th units were commissioned in June 2006 and 9th and 10th units were commissioned in 2011. Two more  ultra-supercritical units were commissioned in 2017.

Electricity is delivered to Beijing via  transmission lines.

The interval of 50 days between the commissioning of the two units of Phase I set a new record of the shortest construction time among comparable units in the North China region.

Fuel supply

See also 

 List of coal power stations
 List of largest power stations
 List of power stations in China

References 

Coal-fired power stations in China